Palaeomolis rothschildi is a moth of the subfamily Arctiinae. It was described by Paul Dognin in 1911. It is found in Colombia.

References

Arctiini
Moths described in 1911